Gelria may refer to:
 1385 Gelria, a Main Belt asteroid
 Gelria (bacterium), a bacterium genus in the family Thermoanaerobacteriales